('Drive to the East', or 'push eastward', 'desire to push east') was the name for a 19th-century German nationalist intent to expand Germany into Slavic territories of Central and Eastern Europe. In some historical discourse,  combines  historical German settlement in Central and Eastern Europe, medieval (12th to 13th century) military expeditions such as those of the Teutonic Knights (the Northern Crusades), and Germanisation policies and warfare of  modern German states such as those that implemented Nazism's concept of Lebensraum. 

In  Polish works the term  could refer to programs for the Germanization of Poland,
while in 19th-century Germany the slogan was used variously  of a wider nationalist approbation of medieval German settlement in the east and the idea of the "superiority of German culture".

The concept of Drang nach Osten became a core element of Nazi ideology. In Mein Kampf (1925-1926), Adolf Hitler declares the idea to be an essential element of his reorganisation plans for Europe. He states: "It is eastwards, only and always eastwards, that the veins of our race must expand. It is the direction which nature herself has decreed for the expansion of the German peoples."

Origin of the term
Because the term is used almost exclusively in its German form in English, Polish, Russian, Czech and other languages, it has been concluded that the term is of German origin.

Background

During the 19th and the early 20th century  has been associated with the medieval German , the High Medieval migration period of ethnic Germans to Eastern Europe, inhabited by Slavs and Balts. This movement caused legal, cultural, linguistic, religious and economic changes, that had a profound influence on the history of Eastern Europe between the Baltic Sea and the Carpathians.

Massive population increase during the High Middle Ages left increasing numbers of commoners like peasants, craftsmen and artisans displaced, who were joined by nobility not entitled to land inheritance, stimulating the movement of settlers from territories of the Holy Roman Empire, such as the Rhineland, Flanders and Saxony into the sparsely-populated East. These movements were supported by the Slavic kings and dukes and the Church.

The future state of Prussia, named for the conquered Old Prussians, had its roots largely in these movements. As the Middle Ages came to a close, the Teutonic Knights, who had been invited to northern Poland by Konrad of Masovia, had assimilated and forcibly converted much of the southern Baltic coastlands.

After the Partitions of Poland by the Kingdom of Prussia, Austria, and the Russian Empire in the late 18th century, Prussia gained much of western Poland.  The Prussians, and later the Germans, engaged in a policy of Germanization in Polish territories. Russia and Sweden eventually conquered the lands taken by the Teutonic Knights in Estonia and Livonia.

in German discourse
Nazi Germany employed the slogan in calling the Czechs a "Slav bulwark against the " in the 1938 .

Despite  policies, population movement took place in the opposite direction also, as people from rural, less developed areas in the East were attracted by the prospering industrial areas of Western Germany. This phenomenon became known by the German term , literally 'flight from the East'.

The German Empire and Austria-Hungary attempted to expand their power eastward; Germany by gaining influence in the declining Ottoman Empire (the Eastern Question) and Austria-Hungary through the acquisition of territory in the Balkans (such as Bosnia and Herzegovina).

German nationalists called for a new  to oppose what they conceived as a Polish  ('thrust toward the West'). 

 is also the ironic title of a chapter in Eric Joseph Goldberg's book Struggle for Empire, used to point out the "missing" eastward ambitions of Louis the German who instead expanded his kingdom to the West.

Lebensraum concept of Nazi Germany

The term by then had gained enough currency to appear in foreign newspapers without explanation. The , or soldier-peasants, would settle in a fortified line to prevent civilization arising beyond and threatening Germany.

This was greatly hindered by the lack of German people who actually desired to settle in the east, let alone act as Teutonic Knights there. However, the Soviet Union began to reverse the German conquests by 1943, and Nazi Germany was defeated by the Allies in 1945.

Expulsion of Germans from the East after World War II

"Historical Eastern Germany"— historically the land of the Baltic people called Old Prussians who had been colonized and assimilated by German —was split between Poland, Russia, and Lithuania (a Baltic country) and repopulated with settlers of the respective ethnicities. The  line has been accepted to be the eastern German boundary by all post-war German states (East and West Germany, as well as reunited Germany), reneging on all plans to (re-)expand into or (re-)settle territories beyond this line. The Old Prussians were conquered by the Teutonic Knights in the 13th century, and gradually assimilated over the following centuries; the Old Prussian language was extinct by the 17th or early 18th century. Henry Cord Meyer, in his book ": Fortunes of a Slogan-Concept in German–Slavic Relations, 1849–1990" claims that the slogan  originated in the Slavic world, and it also was more widely used than in Germany.

See also
 
 
 
 
 Ober Ost
 Expulsion of Poles by Germany
 
 Germanization
 
 Manifest destiny
 Westernization
 Extermination camp
 Slavophobia

References

Inline

General
 

Anti-Slavic sentiment
Anti-Russian sentiment
German words and phrases
Political quotes
Quotations from religion
Slogans
1840s neologisms
19th century in Germany
Germany–Poland relations
Nazi terminology
Former eastern territories of Germany
Axis powers
Germanization